Separation of powers refers to  the division of a state's government into "branches", each with separate, independent powers and responsibilities, so that the powers of one branch are not in conflict with those of the other branches. The typical division into three branches of government, sometimes called the  model, includes a legislature, an executive, and a judiciary. It can be contrasted with the fusion of powers in parliamentary and semi-presidential systems where there can be overlap in membership and functions between different branches, especially the executive and legislative. In most non-authoritarian jurisdictions, however, the judiciary almost never overlaps with the other branches, whether powers in the jurisdiction are separated or fused.

The intention behind a system of separated powers is to prevent the concentration of power by providing for checks and balances. The separation of powers model is often imprecisely and metonymically used interchangeably with the  principle. While the  model is a common type of separation, there are governments that have more or fewer than three branches.

History

Antiquity 

Aristotle first mentioned the idea of a "mixed government" or hybrid government in his work Politics, where he drew upon many of the constitutional forms in the city-states of Ancient Greece. In the Roman Republic, the Roman Senate, Consuls and the Assemblies showed an example of a mixed government according to Polybius (Histories, Book 6, 11–13). It was Polybius who described and explained the system of checks and balances in detail, crediting Lycurgus of Sparta with the first government of this kind.

Early modern concepts of mixed government 

John Calvin (1509–1564) favoured a system of government that divided political power between democracy and aristocracy (mixed government). Calvin appreciated the advantages of democracy, stating: "It is an invaluable gift if God allows a people to elect its own government and magistrates." In order to reduce the danger of misuse of political power, Calvin suggested setting up several political institutions that should complement and control each other in a system of checks and balances.  In this way, Calvin and his followers resisted political absolutism and furthered the growth of democracy. Calvin aimed to protect the rights and the well-being of ordinary people. 

In 1620 a group of English separatist Congregationalists and Anglicans (later known as the Pilgrim Fathers) founded Plymouth Colony in North America. Enjoying self-rule, they established a bipartite democratic system of government. The "freemen" elected the General Court, which functioned as legislature and judiciary and which in turn elected a governor, who together with his seven "assistants" served in the functional role of providing executive power. Massachusetts Bay Colony (founded 1628), Rhode Island (1636), Connecticut (1636), New Jersey, and Pennsylvania had similar constitutions – they all separated political powers. (Except for Plymouth Colony and Massachusetts Bay Colony, these English outposts added religious freedom to their democratic systems, an important step towards the development of human rights.)

Books like William Bradford's Of Plymouth Plantation (written between 1630 and 1651) were widely read in England. So the form of government in the colonies was well known in the mother country, including to the philosopher John Locke (1632–1704). He deduced from a study of the English constitutional system the advantages of dividing political power into the legislative (which should be distributed among several bodies, for example, the House of Lords and the House of Commons), on the one hand, and the executive and federative power, responsible for the protection of the country and prerogative of the monarch, on the other hand, as the Kingdom of England had no written constitution.

Tripartite System 

During the English Civil War, the parliamentarians viewed the English system of government as composed of three branches - the King, the House of Lords and the House of Commons - where the first should have executive powers only, and the latter two legislative powers. One of the first documents proposing a tripartite system of separation of powers was the Instrument of Government, written by the English general John Lambert in 1653, and soon adopted as the constitution of England for few years during The Protectorate. The system comprised a legislative branch (the Parliament) and two executive branches, the English Council of State and the Lord Protector, all being elected (though the Lord Protector was elected for life) and having checks upon each other.

A further development in English thought was the idea that the judicial powers should be separated from the executive branch. This followed the use of the juridical system by the Crown to prosecute opposition leaders following the Restoration, in the late years of Charles II and during the short reign of James II (namely, during the 1680s).

The first constitutional document to establish the principle of the separation of powers in government between the legislative, executive, and judiciary branches were Pacts and Constitutions of Rights and Freedoms of the Zaporizhian Host written in 1710 by Ukrainian Hetman Pylyp Orlyk.

John Locke's legislative, executive and federative powers 

An earlier forerunner to Montesquieu's tripartite system was articulated by John Locke in his work Two Treatises of Government (1690). In the Two Treatises, Locke distinguished between legislative, executive, and federative power. Locke defined legislative power as having "... the right to direct how the force of the commonwealth shall be employed" (2nd Tr., § 143), while executive power entailed the "execution of the laws that are made, and remain in force" (2nd Tr., § 144). Locke further distinguished federative power, which entailed "the power of war and peace, leagues and alliances, and all transactions with all persons and communities without [outside] the commonwealth" (2nd Tr., § 145), or what is now known as foreign policy. Locke distinguishes between separate powers but not discretely separate institutions, and notes that one body or person can share in two or more of the powers. For instance, Locke noted that while the executive and federative powers are different, they are often combined in a single institution (2nd Tr., § 148).

Locke believed that the legislative power was supreme over the executive and federative powers, which are subordinate. Locke reasoned that the legislative was supreme because it has law-giving authority; "[F]or what can give laws to another, must needs be superior to him" (2nd Tr., §150). According to Locke, legislative power derives its authority from the people, who have the right to make and unmake the legislature:

Locke maintains that there are restrictions on the legislative power. Locke says that the legislature cannot govern arbitrarily, cannot levy taxes or confiscate property without the consent of the governed (cf. "No taxation without representation"), and cannot transfer its law-making powers to another body, known as the nondelegation doctrine (2nd Tr., §142).

Montesquieu's separation of powers system 

The term "tripartite system" is commonly ascribed to French Enlightenment political philosopher Baron de Montesquieu, although he did not use such a term but referred to "distribution" of powers. In The Spirit of the Laws (1748), Montesquieu described the various forms of distribution of political power among a legislature, an executive, and a judiciary. Montesquieu's approach was to present and defend a form of government whose powers were not excessively centralized in a single monarch or similar ruler (a form known then as "aristocracy"). He based this model on the Constitution of the Roman Republic and the British constitutional system. Montesquieu took the view that the Roman Republic had powers separated so that no one could usurp complete power. In the British constitutional system, Montesquieu discerned a separation of powers among the monarch, Parliament, and the courts of law.

Montesquieu argues that each Power should only exercise its own functions. He was quite explicit here:

Separation of powers requires a different source of legitimization, or a different act of legitimization from the same source, for each of the separate powers. If the legislative branch appoints the executive and judicial powers, as Montesquieu indicated, there will be no separation or division of its powers, since the power to appoint carries with it the power to revoke.

Montesquieu actually specified that the independence of the judiciary has to be real, and not merely apparent. The judiciary was generally seen as the most important of the three powers, independent and unchecked.

Checks and balances 

According to the principle of checks and balances, each of the branches of the state should have the power to limit or check the other two, creating a balance between the three separate powers of the state. Each branch's efforts to prevent either of the other branches becoming supreme form part of an eternal conflict, which leaves the people free from government abuses. Immanuel Kant was an advocate of this, noting that "the problem of setting up a state can be solved even by a nation of devils" so long as they possess an appropriate constitution to pit opposing factions against each other.
Checks and balances are designed to maintain the system of separation of powers keeping each branch in its place.  The idea is that it is not enough to separate the powers and guarantee their independence but the branches need to have the constitutional means to defend their own legitimate powers from the encroachments of the other branches. They guarantee that the branches have the same level of power (co-equal), that is, are balanced, so that they can limit each other, avoiding the abuse of power. The origin of checks and balances, like separation of powers itself, is specifically credited to Montesquieu in the Enlightenment (in The Spirit of the Laws, 1748). Under this influence it was implemented in 1787 in the Constitution of the United States. In Federalist No. 78, Alexander Hamilton, citing Montesquieu, redefined the judiciary as a separate branch of government coequal with the legislative and the executive branches. Before Hamilton, many colonists in the American colonies had adhered to British political ideas and conceived of government as divided into executive and legislative branches (with judges operating as appendages of the executive branch).

The following example of the separation of powers and their mutual checks and balances from the experience of the United States Constitution (specifically, Federalist No. 51) is presented as illustrative of the general principles applied in similar forms of government as well:

Comparison between tripartite and bipartite national systems 

Constitutions with a high degree of separation of powers are found worldwide. A number of Latin American countries have electoral branches of government.

The Westminster system is distinguished by a particular entwining of powers, such as in New Zealand. New Zealand's constitution is based on the principle of separation of powers through a series of constitutional safeguards, many of which are tacit. The Executive's ability to carry out decisions often depends on the Legislature, which is elected under the single member representative or mixed member proportional systems. This means that government may be of a single party or a coalition of parties. The Judiciary is also free of government interference. If a series of judicial decisions result in an interpretation of the law which the Executive considers does not reflect the intention of the policy, the Executive can initiate changes to the legislation in question through the Legislature. The Executive cannot direct or request a judicial officer to revise or reconsider a decision; decisions are final. Should there be a dispute between the Executive and Judiciary, the Executive has no authority to direct the Judiciary, or its individual members and vice versa.

Complete separation of powers systems are almost always presidential, although theoretically this need not be the case. There are a few historical exceptions, such as the Directoire system of revolutionary France. Switzerland offers an example of non-Presidential separation of powers today: It is run by a seven-member executive branch, the Federal Council. However, the Federal Council is appointed by parliament (but not dependent on parliament) and, although the judiciary has no power of review, the judiciary is still separate from the other branches.

Typical branches 

 Executive
 Legislature
 Judiciary

Additional branches 

 Auditory
 Central bank
 Civil service commission
 Constitutional court
 Electoral
 Moderating
 Human rights commission
 Ombudsman
 Prosecutory

Three branches

Australia 

Australia does not maintain a strict separation between the legislative and executive branches of government—indeed, government ministers are required to be members of parliament—but the federal judiciary strictly guards its independence from the other two branches. However, under influence from the U.S. constitution, the Australian constitution does define the three branches of government separately, which has been interpreted by the judiciary to induce an implicit separation of powers. State governments have a similar level of separation of power but this is generally on the basis of convention, rather than constitution.

Austria 

The Constitution of Austria was originally written by Hans Kelsen, a prominent constitutional scholar in Europe at that time. Kelsen was to serve as a part of the judicial court of review for Austria as part of its tripartite government.

Brazil 

The Constitution of Brazil, in its second article, establishes that there are three "powers of the Union, independent and harmonic, the Executive, the Legislative and the Judiciary".

Canada 

The Constitution Act, 1867 provides that there shall be an executive, a legislature, and the judiciary.  At the federal level, the executive power is assigned to the monarch of Canada, acting through their representative, the Governor General of Canada.  The legislative function is assigned to the Parliament of Canada, composed of the monarch, the Senate and the House of Commons.  The judicial powers are primarily assigned to the provincial superior courts, but provision was made for the creation of federal courts by Parliament. The federal courts now include the Supreme Court of Canada, the Federal Court of Appeal, and the Federal Court of Canada.

The Supreme Court of Canada has repeatedly emphasised that the separation of powers is an important structural element of the Constitution of Canada.  For example, in giving the majority judgment in Ontario v Criminal Lawyers' Association of Ontario, Justice Karakatsanis stated:

Canada, like other parliamentary countries using the Westminster system, has a fusion between the executive and the legislative branches, with the Prime Minister and other Cabinet ministers being members of Parliament.  However, the two branches have distinct roles, and in certain instances can come into conflict with each other.  For example, in June 2021, the Speaker of the House of Commons directed a member of the public service to comply with an order of the House of Commons to share certain documents with the Commons, and the public servant refused to do so.  The federal government announced that it would challenge the Speaker's ruling in the Federal Court.

The separation of powers is much stricter between the judicial branch, on the one hand, and the elected legislative and executive branches, on the other hand.  The Supreme Court has held that judicial independence is a fundamental principle of the Constitution of Canada.  The courts are independent from the elected branches in fulfilling their duties and reaching their decisions.

Similar structural principles apply with provincial and territorial governments, including the strong separation between the judiciary and the elected branches.

Commonwealth of Nations 
The Commonwealth (Latimer House) Principles have been adopted in Abuja, Nigeria, in 2003.

Czech Republic 

The Constitution of the Czech Republic, adopted in 1992 immediately before the dissolution of Czechoslovakia, establishes the traditional tripartite division of powers and continues the tradition of its predecessor constitutions. The Czechoslovak Constitution of 1920, which replaced the provisional constitution adopted by the newly independent state in 1918, was modelled after the constitutions of established democracies such as those of the United Kingdom, United States and France, and maintained this division, as have subsequent changes to the constitution that followed in 1948 with the Ninth-of-May Constitution, the 1960 Constitution of Czechoslovakia as well as the Constitutional Act on the Czechoslovak Federation of 1968.

Denmark 

 Parliament – legislature
 Prime Minister, Cabinet, Government Departments and Civil Service – executive
 High Courts and lower courts – judiciary

France 

According to the Constitution of the Fifth Republic, the government of France is divided into three branches:

 Executive. This includes the popularly elected president as well as the prime minister and cabinet. The French Prime minister is nominated by the president, but the government is responsible to the lower house of the legislature, the National Assembly.
 Legislature. A bicameral legislature that includes the Senate (upper house) and the National Assembly (lower house). The relationship between the two houses is asymmetric, meaning that in case of dispute, the National Assembly has the final word according to Article 45 of the Constitution.
 Judiciary. This includes the judicial and administrative orders. It also includes a constitutional court.

Hong Kong 

Hong Kong is a Special Administrative Region established in 1997 pursuant to the Sino-British Joint Declaration, an international treaty made between Britain and China in 1984, registered with the United Nations. The Hong Kong Basic Law, a national law of China that serves as the de facto constitution, divides the government into Executive, Legislative, and Judicial bodies.

However, according to the former Secretary for Security, Regina Ip, also a current member of the Executive Council(ExCo) and Legislative Council of Hong Kong, Hong Kong never practices Separation of Powers after the handover of Hong Kong back to China.

Nevertheless, Hong Kong's policy was decided by the Governor in Council before 1997, and it became the Chief Executive in Council afterwards. No matter when, some members of the Executive Council are also members of the Legislative Council. When the same person holds positions in the executive and legislative branches at the same time, the two powers are integrated rather than separated, and so it does not constitute a strict separation of powers, it is because checks and balances has been lost. This institutional practice existed long before 1997 during the British rule and has been followed ever since.

India 

India follows constitutional democracy which offers a clear separation of powers. The judiciary is independent of the other two branches with the power to interpret the constitution. Parliament has the legislative powers. Executive powers are vested in the President who is advised by the Union Council of Ministers headed by the Prime Minister. The constitution of India vested the duty of protecting, preserving and defending the constitution with the President as common head of the executive, parliament, armed forces, etc.—not only for the union government but also the various state governments in a federal structure. All three branches have "checks and balances" over each other to maintain the balance of power and not to exceed the constitutional limits.

 President can set aside a law passed by the legislative or an advise given by the Union Council of Ministers when it is inconsistent with the constitution of India.
 Even if the president accepts a law passed duly by the legislative, it can be repealed by the Supreme Court after a fair trial if it is against the Basic structure of the constitution. Any citizen of India can approach the Supreme Court directly to repeal the unconstitutional laws made by the legislative or executive.
 President can be removed from office for unconstitutional decisions after an impeachment trial conducted by the parliament.
 President can be removed by Supreme Court of India under article 71(1) for electoral malpractice or on the grounds of losing eligibility for the position.
 Parliament can impeach judges of Supreme Court and High Courts of states for their incompetence and mala fides. A higher bench of judges can set aside the incorrect judgements of a smaller bench of judges to uphold the constitution.

Iran 

Absolute Guardian of Islamist Jurist - Supreme leader
 Government – Executive
 The legislature of Islamic Republic of Iran – Legislative
 Judicial system – Judicial

Ireland 

 Oireachtas – legislature
 Taoiseach, Cabinet, Government Departments – executive
 High Court and lower courts – judiciary

Italy 

In Italy the powers are separated, even though the Council of Ministers needs a vote of confidence from both chambers of Parliament (which represents a large number of members, around 600).

Like every parliamentary form of government, there is no complete separation between Legislature and Executive, rather a continuum between them due to the confidence link. The balance between these two branches is protected by Constitution and between them and the judiciary, which is really independent.

Japan 

Based on popular sovereignty, the Government of Japan is divided into the legislative, executive and judicial branches. All of the branches of government operate under the framework set by the post-WWII Constitution ratified in 1947.

Legislative power is vested in the bicameral parliament of Japan, the National Diet (国会, Kokkai). The Diet consists of the House of Councillors (参議院, Sangiin) as the upper house and the House of Representatives (衆議院, Shugiin) as the lower house. Members of both houses are elected under a parallel voting system.

The executive power of the state is vested in the Cabinet of Japan (内閣, Naikaku). The Prime Minister (内閣総理大臣, Naikaku Sōri-Daijin) serves as the head of the Cabinet and is designated from among the members of the Diet. As a parliamentary democracy, the Prime Minister and Cabinet ministers are responsible to parliament and can be dismissed by a motion of no confidence.

Judicial power is vested in the Supreme Court (最高裁判所, Saikō-Saibansho). It is the ultimate judicial authority on matters of constitutional and national law interpretation. It also has the power of judicial review, allowing it to review the constitutionality of laws.

Malaysia 

 Parliament – legislature
 Prime Minister, Cabinet, Government Departments and Civil Service – executive
 Federal Courts and lower courts – judiciary

Mexico 

Article 49 of the Mexican Constitution establishes that the Supreme Power of the Federation is divided in three Powers, the Executive, the Legislative and the Judiciary.

Netherlands 

 States General
 Government - executive
 Supreme Court

Nepal 

 Legislative Parliament – Legislature
 Prime Minister, Cabinet of Minister and Government Departments – Executive
 Supreme Court – Judiciary

Norway 

 Parliament – legislature
 The King, Prime Minister, Cabinet of Norway, Government Departments and Civil Service – executive
 The Supreme Court, High Courts and lower courts – judiciary

A note on the status of separation of power, checks and balances, and balance of power in Norway today.

In the original constitution of 1814 the Montesquieu concept was enshrined, and the people at the time had the same skepticism about political parties as the American founding fathers and the revolutionaries in France. Nor did people really want to get rid of the king and the Council of State (privy council). King and council was a known concept that people had lived with for a long time and for the most part were comfortable with. The 1814 constitution came about as a reaction to external events, most notable the Treaty of Kiel (see 1814 in Norway). There was no revolution against the current powers, as had been the case in the U.S. and France.

As there was no election of the executive, the king reigned supremely independent in selecting the members of the Council of State, no formal political parties formed until the 1880s. A conflict between the executive and legislature started developing in the 1870s and climaxed with the legislature impeaching the entire Council of State in 1884 (see Statsrådssaken [Norwegian Wikipedia page]). With this came a switch to a parliamentary system of government. While the full process took decades, it has led to a system of parliamentary sovereignty, where the Montesquieu idea of separation of powers is technically dead even though the three branches remain important institutions.

This does not mean that there are no checks and balances. With the introduction of a parliamentary system, political parties started to form quickly, which led to a call for electoral reform that saw the introduction of Party-list proportional representation in 1918. The peculiarities of the Norwegian election system generate 6–8 parties and make it extremely difficult for a single party to gain an absolute majority. It has only occurred for a brief period in the aftermath of World War II where the Labour Party had an absolute majority.

A multi-party system parliament that must either form a minority executive or a coalition executive functions as a perfectly good system of checks and balances even if it was never a stated goal for the introduction of multiparty system. The multiparty system came about in response to a public outcry of having too few parties and a general feeling of a lack of representation. For this reason, very little on the topic of separation of powers or checks and balances can be found in the works of Norwegian political sciences today.

Pakistan 

 Parliament – Legislative
 Prime Minister and their Cabinet – Executive
 Supreme Court and lower courts – Judicial

Philippines 

 Legislative Department: bicameral Congress (Senate, House of Representatives)
 Executive Department: President, Vice President, and the Cabinet
 Judicial Department: Supreme Court and other courts

In addition, the 1987 Philippine Constitution provides for three independent Constitutional Commissions:

 Civil Service Commission
 Commission on Elections
 Commission on Audit

Other Independent Constitutional Bodies:

 Office of the Ombudsman
 Commission on Human Rights
 National Economic and Development Authority
 Bangko Sentral ng Pilipinas (Central Bank of the Philippines)

South Korea 

 National Assembly of South Korea – Legislature
 Executive branch of South Korea - Executive
 Judiciary of South Korea – Judiciary

Turkey 

 Parliament – legislature
 President, Council of Ministers and Government Departments – executive
 High Courts and lower courts – judiciary

United Kingdom 

 Parliament – legislature
 Prime Minister, Cabinet, Government Departments and Civil Service – executive
 Courts – judiciary

The development of the British constitution, which is not a codified document, is based on fusion in the person of the Monarch, who has a formal role to play in the legislature (Parliament, which is where legal and political sovereignty lies, is the Crown-in-Parliament, and is summoned and dissolved by the Sovereign who must give his or her Royal Assent to all Bills so that they become Acts), the executive (the Sovereign appoints all ministers of His/Her Majesty's Government, who govern in the name of the Crown) and the judiciary (the Sovereign, as the fount of justice, appoints all senior judges, and all public prosecutions are brought in his or her name).

Although the doctrine of separation of power plays a role in the United Kingdom's constitutional life, the constitution is often described as having "a weak separation of powers" (A. V. Dicey) despite it being the one to which Montesquieu originally referred. For example, the executive forms a subset of the legislature, as did—to a lesser extent—the judiciary until the establishment of the Supreme Court of the United Kingdom. The Prime Minister, the Chief Executive, sits as a member of the Parliament of the United Kingdom, either as a peer in the House of Lords or as an elected member of the House of Commons (by convention, and as a result of the supremacy of the Lower House, the Prime Minister now sits in the House of Commons). Furthermore, while the courts in the United Kingdom are amongst the most independent in the world, the Law Lords, who were the final arbiters of most judicial disputes in the U.K. sat simultaneously in the House of Lords, the upper house of the legislature, although this arrangement ceased in 2009 when the Supreme Court of the United Kingdom came into existence. Furthermore, because of the existence of Parliamentary sovereignty, while the theory of separation of powers may be studied there, a system such as that of the U.K. is more accurately described as a "fusion of powers".

Until 2005, the Lord Chancellor fused in his person the Legislature, Executive and Judiciary, as he was the ex officio Speaker of the House of Lords, a Government Minister who sat in Cabinet and was head of the Lord Chancellor's Department, which administered the courts, the justice system and appointed judges, and was the head of the Judiciary in England and Wales and sat as a judge on the Judicial Committee of the House of Lords, the highest domestic court in the entire United Kingdom, and the Judicial Committee of the Privy Council, the senior tribunal court for parts of the Commonwealth. The Lord Chancellor also had certain other judicial positions, including being a judge in the Court of Appeal and President of the Chancery Division. The Lord Chancellor combines other aspects of the constitution, including having certain ecclesiastical functions of the established state church, making certain church appointments, nominations and sitting as one of the thirty-three Church Commissioners. These functions remain intact and unaffected by the Constitutional Reform Act. In 2005, the Constitutional Reform Act separated the powers with Legislative functions going to an elected Lord Speaker and the Judicial functions going to the Lord Chief Justice. The Lord Chancellor's Department was replaced with a Ministry of Justice and the Lord Chancellor currently serves in the position of Secretary of State for Justice.

The judiciary has no power to strike down primary legislation, and can only rule on secondary legislation that it is invalid with regard to the primary legislation if necessary.

Under the concept of parliamentary sovereignty, Parliament can enact any primary legislation it chooses. However, the concept immediately becomes problematic when the question is asked, "If parliament can do anything, can it bind its successors?" It is generally held that parliament can do no such thing.

Equally, while statute takes precedence over precedent-derived common law and the judiciary has no power to strike down primary legislation, there are certain cases where the supreme judicature has effected an injunction against the application of an act or reliance on its authority by the civil service. The seminal example of this is the Factortame case, where the House of Lords granted such an injunction preventing the operation of the Merchant Shipping Act 1988 until litigation in the European Court of Justice had been resolved.

The House of Lords ruling in Factortame (No. 1), approving the European Court of Justice formulation that "a national court which, in a case before it concerning Community law, considers that the sole obstacle which precludes it from granting interim relief is a rule of national law, must disapply that rule", has created an implicit tiering of legislative reviewability; the only way for parliament to prevent the supreme judicature from injunctively striking out a law on the basis of incompatibility with Community law is to pass an act specifically removing that power from the court, or by repealing the European Communities Act 1972.

The British legal systems are based on common law traditions, which require:

 Police or regulators cannot initiate complaints under criminal law but can only investigate (prosecution is mostly reserved for the Crown Prosecution Service), which prevents selective enforcement—e.g., the "fishing expedition," which is often specifically forbidden.
 Prosecutors cannot withhold evidence from counsel for the defendant; to do so results in mistrial or dismissal. Accordingly, their relation to police is no advantage.
 Defendants convicted can appeal, but only fresh and compelling evidence not available at trial can be introduced, restricting the power of the court of appeal to the process of law applied.

United States 

Separation of powers was first established in the United States Constitution, wherein the founders included features of many new concepts, including hard-learned historical lessons about the checks and balances of power. Similar concepts were also prominent in the state governments of the United States. As colonies of Great Britain, the founders considered that the American states had suffered an abuse of the broad power of parliamentarism and monarchy. As a remedy, the United States Constitution limits the powers of the federal government through various means—in particular, the three branches of the federal government are divided by exercising different functions. The executive and legislative powers are separated in origin by separate elections, and the judiciary is kept independent. Each branch controls the actions of others and balances its powers in some way.

In the Constitution, Article 1 Section I grants Congress only those "legislative powers herein granted" and proceeds to list those permissible actions in Article I Section 8, while Section 9 lists actions that are prohibited for Congress. The vesting clause in Article II places no limits on the Executive branch, simply stating that "The Executive Power shall be vested in a President of the United States of America." The Supreme Court holds "The judicial Power" according to Article III, and judicial review was established in Marbury v. Madison under the Marshall court.

The presidential system adopted by the Constitution of the United States obeys the balance of powers sought, and not found, by the constitutional monarchy. The people appoint their representatives to meet periodically in a legislative body, and, since they do not have a king, the people themselves elect a preeminent citizen to perform, also periodically, the executive functions of the State.

The direct election of the head of state or of the executive power is an inevitable consequence of the political freedom of the people, understood as the capacity to appoint and depose their leaders. Only this separate election of the person who has to fulfill the functions that the Constitution attributes to the president, so different by its nature and by its function from the election of representatives of the electors, allows the executive power to be controlled by the legislative and submitted to the demands of political responsibility.

Judicial independence is maintained by appointments for life, which remove any dependence on the Executive, with voluntary retirement and a high threshold for dismissal by the Legislature, in addition to a salary that cannot be diminished during their service.

The federal government refers to the branches as "branches of government", while some systems use "government" exclusively to describe the executive. The Executive branch has attempted to claim power arguing for separation of powers to include being the Commander-in-Chief of a standing army since the American Civil War, executive orders, emergency powers, security classifications since World War II, national security, signing statements, and the scope of the unitary executive.

Other systems

Belgium 

The constitution of 1831, considered one of the most liberal of its time for limiting the powers of its monarch and imposing a rigorous system of separation of powers, is based on three principles (represented in the Schematic overview of Belgian institutions).

 (horizontal separation of powers):

 The legislative power is attributed to a parliamentary body elected through a representative general election system (one person, one vote).
 The executive power is attributed to the Council of Ministers. Ministers are formally appointed by the King though in practice the prime minister decides the composition of his cabinet. The ministers are usually from the elected members of parliament (although non-elected people can also be nominated); however, they must first resign from their elected seat.
 The judicial power is in the hands of the courts. Magistrates are nominated by the minister on proposal from a Council of the Magistrates.
 Magistrates can be nominated to become a judge (sitting magistrates) or instructing judge (investigating judge) of Procureur (public prosecutor) (the standing magistrates).
 The executive branch of the government is responsible for providing the physical means to execute its role (infrastructure, staff, financial means).
 Judges and some other people cannot run for elected office while they are nominated to certain positions (military, police-officers, clergy, notaries, bailiffs).

Subsidiarity (vertical separation of powers):

 Supranational directives (EU legislation) and international treaties are subjected to approval of the federal level (the federal level being Belgium the nation state)
 The federal level comprises the following:
 A bicameral parliament (House of Representatives and Senate) (in 2014 this will be a directly elected house and an indirectly appointed Senate of the regions)
 A federal government (led by the Prime Minister, ministers and secretaries of state)
 Tasked with overseeing justice, defence, foreign affairs, social security, and public health
 High Court, Constitutional Court, Cassation Court and Council of State
 The regional level comprises the following:
 A unicameral parliament
 A regional government led by the minister-president (ministers and secretaries of state) is tasked with regional matters
 Provinces also have similar structures:
 A unicameral provincial council
 A nominated provincial governor assisted by deputies is tasked with provincial matters
 Appellate Court, Assizes Court
 An intermediate level of Arrondissements subdivides the provinces
 it has only an executive level with arrondissemental commissars
 City and communal entities (local government):
 A city or communal council
 A mayor, assisted by aldermen, is tasked with local matters
 Magistrates Court, Correctional Court (three judges)
 Justice of the peace and Police Court judges (single judge courts)

Secularism (separation of state and religion):

 The king, the head of state, holds no political authority and requires executive approval by a minister for every action and statement; he nominates the ministers but he does not choose them (his executive powers); he signs and decrees the laws voted in parliament (his legislative powers);
 The head of state is commander in chief of the military (in title only), politically the military depends on the Minister of Defence and the chiefs of staff are responsible towards parliament and take their orders from the Minister of Defence and the government;
 Certain functions are deemed incompatible and people must resign from their function if they want to assume responsibilities in another function (military commanders have never been government ministers, even during a war).

China

Imperial China 

 Three Lords and Nine Ministers (ancient)

Three Lords:

 Chancellor – executive leader
 Grandee Secretary (Censorate chief and also Deputy Chancellor) – supervisory leader
 Grand Commandant – military leader

Nine Ministers / Nine Courts, etc.

 Three Departments and Six Ministries (medieval)
 Department of State Affairs – edict execution
 Ministry of Personnel
 Ministry of Revenue
 Ministry of Rites
 Ministry of War
 Ministry of Justice
 Ministry of Works
 Secretariat – edict formulation
 Chancellery – edict review
 Censorate – supervision
 Nine Courts, Five Directorates, etc.

 Ming and Qing dynasties
 Emperor, via Grand Council or equivalent
 Grand Secretariat (cabinet) – edict formulation
 Six Ministries – edict execution
 Censorate – supervision
 Reviewers of the  – supervising the Six Ministries
 13~20 Circuits investigating censors –supervising regional officials
 Five Courts, etc.

 Judicial

:

 Ministry of Justice – case judgement
 Censorate – case supervision
 Court of Judicature and Revision – case review

 Military
 Emperor
 Privy Council or equivalent
 Ministry of War

Republic of China 

According to Sun Yat-sen's idea of "separation of the five powers", the government of the Republic of China has five branches:

 Executive Yuan – led by the premier but in actuality it is the president who sets policy – executive
 Legislative Yuan – unicameral – legislature
 Judicial Yuan – its Constitutional Court (highest) and Supreme Court have different jurisdictions – judiciary
 Control Yuan – audit branch
 Examination Yuan – civil service personnel management and human resources

The president and vice president as well as the defunct National Assembly are constitutionally not part of the above five branches. Before being abolished in 2005, the National Assembly was a standing constituent assembly and electoral college for the president and vice president. Its constitutional amending powers were passed to the legislative yuan and its electoral powers were passed to the electorate.

The relationship between the executive and legislative branches are poorly defined. An example of the problems this causes is the near complete political paralysis that results when the president, who has neither the power to veto nor the ability to dissolve the legislature and call new elections, cannot negotiate with the legislature when his party is in the minority. The examination and control yuans are marginal branches; their leaders as well as the leaders of the executive and judicial yuans are appointed by the president and confirmed by the legislative yuan. The legislature is the only branch that chooses its own leadership. The vice president has practically no responsibilities.

People's Republic of China 

The central government of the People's Republic of China is nominally divided among several state organs:

 National People's Congress (NPC): the ultimate power of the state that makes the constitution and basic laws, and supervises and elects all following organs;
 Standing Committee of the National People's Congress (NPCSC): the permanent legislative organ that makes most laws, interprets the constitution and laws, conducts judicial review, and supervises all following organs;
 President: acts as a ceremonial head of state in compliance with decisions made by the NPCSC but exercises an independent power to nominate the Premier of the State Council;
 State Council (synonymous with "Central People's Government"): the executive branch, whose Premier is the head of government;
 Central Military Commission (CMC): the military branch, whose Chairman is the commander-in-chief of the national armed forces including the People's Liberation Army (PLA), the People's Armed Police (PAP), and the Militia;
 National Supervisory Commission (NSC): the supervisory branch;
 Supreme People's Court (SPC): the judicial branch;
 Supreme People's Procuratorate (SPP): the prosecutorial branch.

The codification of the Chinese Communist Party's one-party system renders the division of power amongst these organs a formality. Most practical political power is held by the Politburo Standing Committee dominated by the General Secretary, who serves as the country's supreme leader.

Costa Rica 

In the aftermath of the 43-day civil war in 1948 (after former President and incumbent candidate Rafael Ángel Calderón Guardia tried to take power through fraud, by not recognising the results of the presidential election that he had lost), the question of which transformational model the Costa Rican State would follow was the main issue that confronted the victors. A Constituent Assembly was elected by popular vote to draw up a new constitution, enacted in 1949, and remains in force. This document was an edit of the constitution of 1871, as the constituent assembly rejected more radical corporatist ideas proposed by the ruling Junta Fundadora de la Segunda República (which, although having come to power by military force, abolished the armed forces). Nonetheless, the new constitution increased centralization of power at the expense of municipalities and eliminated provincial government altogether, and at the time it increased the powers of congress and the judiciary.

It established the three supreme powers as the legislative, executive, and judicial branches, but also created two other autonomous state organs that have equivalent power, but not equivalent rank. The first is the Tribunal Supremo de Elecciones de Costa Rica (electoral branch), which controls elections and makes unique, unappealable decisions on their outcomes.

The second is the office of the Comptroller General (audit branch), an autonomous and independent organ nominally subordinate to the unicameral legislative assembly. All budgets of ministries and municipalities must pass through this agency, including the execution of budget items such as contracting for routine operations. The Comptroller also provides financial vigilance over government offices and office holders, and routinely brings actions to remove mayors for malfeasance, firmly establishing this organization as the fifth branch of the Republic.

European Union 

The European Union is a supranational polity, and is neither a country nor a federation; but as the EU wields political power it complies with the principle of separation of powers. There are seven institutions of the European Union. In intergovernmental matters, most power is concentrated in the Council of the European Union—giving it the characteristics of a normal international organization. Here, all power at the EU level is in one branch. In the latter there are four main actors. The European Commission acts as an independent executive which is appointed by the Council in conjunction with the European Parliament; but the commission also has a legislative role as the sole initiator of EU legislation.
 An early maxim was: "The Commission proposes and the Council disposes"; and although the EU's lawmaking procedure is now much more complicated, this simple maxim still holds some truth. As well as both executive and legislative functions, the Commission arguably exercises a third, quasi-judicial, function under Articles 101 & 102 TFEU (competition law ); although the ECJ remains the final arbiter. The European Parliament is one half of the legislative branch and is directly elected. The Council itself acts both as the second half of the legislative branch and also holds some executive functions (some of which are exercised by the related European Council in practice). The European Court of Justice acts as the independent judicial branch, interpreting EU law and treaties. The remaining institution, the European Court of Auditors, is an independent audit authority (due to the sensitive nature of fraud in the EU).

 Council of the European Union – executive and legislative
 European Commission – executive, legislative and quasi-judicial
 European Council – executive
 European Court of Auditors – audit
 Court of Justice of the European Union and the General Court – judicial
 European Parliament – legislative

Germany 

The three branches in German government are further divided into six main bodies enshrined in the Basic Law for the Federal Republic of Germany:

 Federal President (Bundespräsident) – formally executive, but mainly representative in daily politics
 Federal Cabinet (Bundesregierung) – executive
 Federal Diet (Bundestag) & Federal Council (Bundesrat) – bicameral legislative
 Federal Assembly (Bundesversammlung) – presidential electoral college (consisting of the members of the Bundestag and electors from the constituent states)
 Federal Constitutional Court (Bundesverfassungsgericht) – judiciary

Besides the constitutional court, the judicial branch at the federal level is made up of five supreme courts—one for civil and criminal cases (Bundesgerichtshof), and one each for administrative, tax, labour, and social security issues. There are also state-based (Länder / Bundesländer) courts beneath them, and a rarely used senate of the supreme courts.

Hungary 

The four independent branches of power in Hungary (the parliament, the government, the court system, and the office of the public accuser) are divided into six bodies:

 Parliament (Magyar Országgyűlés): elected every 4 years by the people in a highly complex, one-round voting system
 Government (Magyar Kormány): installed and removed by simple majority vote of the parliament, 4-year terms
 Supreme Court (Legfelsőbb Bíróság): Chief justice elected by qualified (2/3) majority of the parliament, no government oversight
 Constitutional court (Alkotmánybíróság): members elected by qualified majority of the parliament for 8 years, this body nullifies laws and has no government oversight
 Chief public accuser (Legfőbb ügyész): elected by qualified majority of the parliament, 6-year terms, office budget fixed, no government oversight
 The President of the Republic (Köztársasági Elnök) is elected by qualified majority of the Hungarian parliament for 5-year terms (cannot be reelected more than once). The President's task is to oversee the functioning of the democracy. Most powers are ceremonial: like signing laws into power and commanding the military in time of peace. The president can also return accepted bills once with advices to the Parliament for reconsideration or can also request nullification in advance from the Constitutional Court. The president can negotiate with civil/professional unions regarding the bills. Without the President's permission, the country can neither declare war nor deploy the armed forces.

The independent pillar status of the Hungarian public accuser's office is a unique construction, loosely modelled on Portugal's system (Portugal has four branches of government; the President, who is the non-executive head of state, the Prime Minister and the Government, the legislative Parliament, and the Constitutional Court), introduced after the 1974 victory of the Carnation Revolution. The public accuser (attorney general) body has become the fourth column of Hungarian democracy only in recent times: after communism fell in 1989, the office was made independent by a new clause (XI) of the Constitution. The change was meant to prevent abuse of state power, especially with regards to the use of false accusations against opposition politicians, who may be excluded from elections if locked in protracted or excessively severe court cases.

To prevent the Hungarian accuser's office from neglecting its duties, natural human private persons can submit investigation requests, called "pótmagánvád," directly to the courts if the accusers' office refuses to. Courts will decide if the allegations have merit and order police to act in lieu of the accuser's office if warranted. In its decision No. 42/2005, the Hungarian constitutional court declared that the government does not enjoy such privilege and the state is powerless to further pursue cases if the public accuser refuses to do so.

Historical 

Notable examples of states after Montesquieu that had more than three powers include:

 Quadripartite Systems:
 The Empire of Brazil (1822–1889) had, in addition to the three traditional powers, the moderating power, which was exercised solely by the Emperor, and whose function was resolving conflicts between the other powers.
 The Vermont Republic and the Commonwealth of Pennsylvania both had a collective executive (Supreme Executive Council), a unicameral legislature (Assembly), an elected judiciary (Supreme Court), and the Council of Censors this group was responsible for ensuring constitutionality of the Executive, Legislative, and Judiciary branches of government and auditing taxes and could also either censure or impeach any member of government who they had found to have violated the constitution they also had the sole power to both call constitution conventions and amend the constitution

See also

Notes

References

Further reading 

 Peter Barenboim, Biblical Roots of Separation of Powers, Moscow, Letny Sad, 2005. , Permalink: LC Catalog - Item Information (Full Record)
 Biancamaria Fontana (ed.), The Invention of the Modern Republic (2007) 
 W. B. Gwyn, The Meaning of the Separation of Powers (1965) (no ISBN)
 Bernard Manin, Principles of Representative Government (1995; English version 1997)  (hbk),  (pbk)
 José María Maravall and Adam Przeworski (eds), Democracy and the Rule of Law (2003)  (hbk),  (pbk)
 Paul A. Rahe, Montesquieu and the Logic of Liberty (2009)  (hbk),  (pbk)
  Iain Stewart, "Men of Class:  Aristotle, Montesquieu and Dicey on 'Separation of Powers' and 'the Rule of Law'" 4 Macquarie Law Journal 187 (2004)
 Iain Stewart, "Montesquieu in England: his 'Notes on England', with Commentary and Translation" (2002)
 Alec Stone Sweet, Governing with Judges: Constitutional Politics in Europe (2000) 
 Reinhold Zippelius, Allgemeine Staatslehre/Politikwissenschaft (= Political Science), 16th edition, § 31, C.H. Beck, Munich, 2010, 
 Evan C. Zoldan, Is the Federal Judiciary Independent of Congress?, 70 Stan. L. Rev. Online 135 (2018).

External links 

 Polybius and the Founding Fathers: the separation of powers
 Arbitrary Government Described and the Government of the Massachusetts Vindicated from that Aspersion (1644)

 
Constitutional law
Philosophy of law
Political science terminology
Montesquieu